Malamaal Weekly is a 2006 Indian Hindi-language comedy film written and directed by Priyadarshan and starring Paresh Rawal, Om Puri, Riteish Deshmukh, Rajpal Yadav and Asrani. The film received mixed reviews from critics, but was successful at the box office, grossing ₹42.7 crore against a budget of ₹7 crore. The film was remade in Telugu as Bhagyalakshmi Bumper Draw and in Kannada as  Dakota Picture. Priyadarshan himself remade the film in Malayalam as Aamayum Muyalum.

Plot
The film takes place in the impoverished village of Laholi where, following droughts, most of the villagers' possessions are mortgaged to the local Thakurani Karamkali (Sudha Chandran). One of the few entertainments the villagers can afford is the lottery, Malaamal Weekly (malamal is Hindi for 'rich').

Lilaram (Paresh Rawal) is the only educated man in the village. He has the job of intermediary between the lottery organization and the village, for which he receives a commission whenever a villager wins; thus, he has a relatively good but volatile income. One day he reads the winning lottery numbers and realizes that one of the tickets has won the top prize of one crore (10 million Indian currency or about $160,000, a relative fortune in rural India). He devises a plan to obtain the winning ticket and present it to the commission as his own. He hosts a dinner (mortgaging his wife's beloved pet goat Gattu who is like a child to her, to the Thakurani to pay for it) and invites all the villagers who play the lottery, but the man he is looking for does not turn up. By elimination, he deduces that the winner is Anthony (Innocent), the town drunk, and reasons that he didn't turn up because he knew that he had won the top prize. Hoping to at least extract his commission, he goes to Anthony's house, and finds him dead, the winning ticket clutched in his hand and a happy expression on his face.

Lilaram attempts to pry the ticket from Anthony's fingers but is thwarted by Anthony's body in rigor mortis. Lilaram eventually succeeds in freeing it with a knife; at this point Ballu (Om Puri), the local dairy farmer, enters the house and discovers him standing over Anthony's corpse with what appears to be the murder weapon in his hand. Ballu's unfortunate assistant Kanhaiya (Riteish) has a hard time of following Ballu's orders and makes a lot of mistakes. He has emotional involvement with Ballu's daughter Sukhmani (Reema Sen) also joined with them. Lilaram tells Ballu the truth and convinces him to remain silent in exchange for sharing the lottery winnings between them.

Unfortunately for them, before dying Anthony managed to call the lottery commission and give his name and address, as well as his sister and several people to whom he owed money to tell them of his good fortune. The secret soon becomes impossible to keep, and Lilaram must figure out how to fool the lottery inspector (Arbaaz Khan), who is on high way to the village to interview Anthony. To cover up the whole incident as per the plan of Lilaram, Ballu acted as living Antony and the inspector became satisfied. After that Ballu, Kanhaiya and Lilaram are introduced to a solitary man named Joseph (Shakti Kapoor) as Kanhaiya also fails to hide Anthony's body but has a secret romance with Sukhmani. All of them successfully buried Antony but unfortunately, Bajbahadur aka Bajey (Rajpal Yadav), brother of Thakurani knew their secret plan and Antony's death case. He started threatening them. Some days later, Chokeylal (Asrani) Kanhaiya's father comes to the village and hears of Kanhaiya's insolence which prompts him to lock his own son in Ballu's barn because Kanhaiya obstructing the plan of getting money from the lottery. Later, Gattu is sold by Thakurani to the butchers and Leela and his wife come to know about this and are heartbroken. At night Lilaram, Ballu, Chokey and Joseph manage to catch Baje. But they fail to kidnap Bajey and accidentally kidnap Joseph by mistake. Bajey was kidnapped by another gang of nearby village due to their personal vendetta.

After few days the said Lottery inspector comes to the village and gives the demand draft to Ballu. When he is returning, Thakurani and Bajey's gang try to catch him up to inform the real fact of Antony's lottery ticket. Ballu, Lilaram, Kanhaiya and rest of the villagers try to stop Thakurani and Bajey, ensuing a chaotic chase. Just when Thakurani catches up with the lottery inspector's car, he hits her motorcycle and Thakurani plunges to death in the town river. The villagers let the inspector go in exchange of promise that he would not say a word to anyone. The movie ends with everyone getting rich except for Bajey, who becomes a beggar.

Cast
 Ritesh Deshmukh as Kanhaiya
 Reema Sen as Sukhmani
 Paresh Rawal as Lilaram aka Leela
 Om Puri as Balwant aka Ballu / Fake Joseph Anthony Fernandes
 Rajpal Yadav as Bajbahadur aka Bajey
 Asrani as Chokheylal, Kanhaiya's father
 Shakti Kapoor as Joseph
 Sudha Chandran as Thakurain
 Arbaaz Khan as Jayesh Agarwal, the lottery inspector
 Rasika Joshi as Mary
 Sona Nair as Tara (Lilaram's wife)
 Geetha Vijayan
 Rakhi Sawant as an item number "Kismat Se Chalti Hai"
 Innocent as Joseph Anthony Fernandes (Tiku Talsania as the Hindi dubbing voice)

Soundtrack

Release
The film was released on 10 March 2006.

Critical reception
The Hindustan Times was broadly positive about Malaamal Weekly, with two reviewers awarding it two and three stars but lauding "the sheer pleasure" of Rawal and Puri's comic performances. Most reviewers, however, were more negative. The BBC gave the film two out of five stars, citing a "weak script" and saying that the humour of Waking Ned had been "lost in translation." Molodezhnaja.ch concurred, repeatedly complaining that the film was too long, had only one song and the rest consisting of "repetitive scenes, long, no, endless dialogue and a poor finale," giving it 2.5 stars on the basis of "a few laughs and solid casting."
It did at least give the single song credit for "breaking up the otherwise monotonous events"; rediff.com described it as "the worst Bollywood song ever" in addition to summing the film up as "simply pathetic." Priyadarshan shrugged off the poor reviews, claiming "My films have never been given good reviews in Mumbai. I'd get seriously worried about my films the day they're reviewed favourably."

Box office
Despite the mixed reviews, the film was a surprise hit at the box office. As of April 2006, the film was the top grosser in Delhi. Made on a budget of ₹7 crore, the film grossed ₹42.7 crore worldwide.

Remakes

Future
A sequel was planned later, which was directed by Priyadarshan, the title of Kamaal Dhamaal Malamaal. It starred Shreyas Talpade, Nana Patekar, Paresh Rawal, Om Puri, Dr.Rajeev Pillai and Rajpal Yadav; the rest of the cast. Though later director Priyadarshan claimed that movie was not a sequel but a reboot.

References

External links
 Malaamal Weekly at Indiafm.com
 
 Malaamal Weekly Website

2006 films
2000s Hindi-language films
2006 comedy films
Indian comedy films
Hindi films remade in other languages
Films directed by Priyadarshan
Indian remakes of British films
Films about lotteries